A Race for Life is a 1928 American silent drama film directed by D. Ross Lederman. Originally, the film was presumed to be lost. However, according to the Library of Congress Database, the film was found in the Netherlands. The film was released with a Vitaphone soundtrack with a synchronised musical score and sound effects.

Cast
 Rin Tin Tin as Rinty, a dog
 Virginia Brown Faire as Virginia Calhoun
 Carroll Nye as Robert Hammond
 Robert Gordon as Danny O'Shea (as Bobby Gordon)
 Jim Mason as Bruce Morgan (as James Mason)
 Pat Hartigan as Tramp

Box office
According to Warner Bros.' records the film earned $168,000 domestically and $75,000 foreign.

Preservation status
A print is preserved at Filmmuseum in the Netherlands, at the EYE Film Institute.

References

External links
 
 

1928 films
1928 drama films
1920s rediscovered films
American horse racing films
Silent American drama films
American silent feature films
1920s English-language films
American black-and-white films
Films directed by D. Ross Lederman
Rin Tin Tin
Rediscovered American films
1920s American films